James C. Calaway was a philanthropist-businessman who resided in Carbondale, Colorado. He was the son of poor tenant farmers in Texas and was the first in his family to ever attend college. He served as the Chair of the Aspen Institutes Society of Fellows before he became a trustee in 1997. In 2000 he was selected as an Honorary Trustee, and later appointed to the Council of Honorary Trustees after its creation. Calaway was in the oil and gas exploration business for over 40 years and retired as Chairman of Edge Petroleum in the late 1980s.  Now, he partners with his son in building wind farms in several states to generate renewable energy.

In addition, following his retirement, Calaway had sights on philanthropy and fundraising for civic groups and non-profit organizations, having served as a regent of the University of Corpus Christi, a trustee of Antioch College, and a board member of the Colorado Mountain College Foundation. He served as Treasurer for the American Civil Liberties Union on the national level and was a lifetime member of the NAACP. Moreover, he co-founded Colorado Animal Rescue, a non-profit animal shelter that has taken in, cared for and adopted out over 17,000 homeless dogs and cats. Calaway received two presidential appointments during Jimmy Carters presidential administration to the National Petroleum Council and as Commissioner of Presidential Scholars. Calaway died on December 12, 2018.

References

External links
 https://web.archive.org/web/20070927215251/http://www.aspeninstitute.org/site/c.huLWJeMRKpH/b.615521/k.BE07/Aspen_Institute_Appoints_James_C_Calaway_Chair_of_its_Council_of_Honorary_Trustees.htm

American businesspeople
2018 deaths
1931 births